Irene Logan (born February 16, 1984) is a Liberian-Ghanaian singer, songwriter, philanthropist and entrepreneur. She and her family moved to Ghana in search of refuge from the First Liberian Civil War. Logan gained recognition after winning the first edition of the Stars of the Future talent show.

Early life

Irene Elizabeth Grace Logan was born on February 16, 1984, in Monrovia, Liberia,  to  Tina Logan, a teacher and Gospel singer, and Thomas Logan, an accountant and musician. Logan lost her father when she was two months old due to an illness; he was 25 years old at the time of his death. She and her mother fled to Accra in search of refuge during the First Liberian Civil War. Logan attended Achimota School in 2003, studying literature, history, and music. She sang in the school's choir and performed for the school at national events. She was also an executive for the writers and debaters club at her secondary school. Logan studied marketing at Zenith University College, but left after her second year to pursue a career in music.

Music career 
Logan won the first season of Stars of the Future in 2006. Her debut single "Runaway" became a hit in Ghana. Her follow-up single "Kabila" also gained recognition. She recorded the song "My Mind Dey", which was used as the soundtrack for the film series Adams Apples. Logan has performed with several artists, including Hugh Masakela, Lagbaja, Jay Z, and Beenie Man, among others. 

In recent years, Logan has transitioned to making Gospel music.

Irene and Jane
Logan met Efya on the Stars of the Future television show. Following the show's conclusion, the two women formed the music duo, Irene & Jane. The duo released their 2009 collaborative album Unveiled, which included the songs "Baby" and "Heated Up". They received a nomination at the 2008 Channel O Music Video Awards. Logan won Best Female Vocalist at the 2007 Ghana Music Awards, and was nominated for a Kora Award in 2008.

Business and philanthropy 
Logan is the CEO and creative director of Tribassa Limited, an African-inspired luxury lifestyle brand. Logan is passionate about giving back to her society, and has volunteered her time to several humanitarian causes. She started the "I am the Future" initiative and partnered with the UNHCR to inspire and assist young men and women in discovering ways to positively impact their communities.

Previous affiliations 
MTN Ambassador 2006
Globacom Limited (Glo) Ambassador 2009
UNHCR Ambassador 2010

Notable performances 
Opening act for Beenie Man at Accra International Conference Centre in 2005
Channel O Music Video Awards 2006
Opened performance for American Hip Hop star Jay Z at Accra International Conference Centre in 2006
Performed at Big Brother Africa show in 2008
Kora Awards 2007
Ghana Music Awards 2008
My Mind Dey song featured in Ghanaian popular Soap Opera Adams Apples
Performed at Ghana Radio and Television Personality Awards in 2012
Guest Performance at Glo xfactor in 2013
Performed Andy Williams’ ‘The Impossible Dream’ at the funeral of the late former president, Jerry John Rawlings (2021)
Performed the "Star Spangled Banner" representing Ghana in celebration of the 4th of July Independence Day (2021)
Performed at the GUBA 2021 awards held in Ghana

Discography

Albums 
Unveiled (with Efya) (2009)

Singles 
"Kabila" (2009)
"Runaway" (featuring Asem) (2009)
"My Mind Dey" (featuring Asem) (2011)
"Emperor" (2011)
"Akwasi Casanova" (2013)
"In Love with a Devil" (2014)
"Na Me Dey There" (2014)
"SA" (2014)
"Stay" (cover) (2014)
"Medowo" (2015)
"Conga" (featuring Wiyaala) (2016)
"More" (2022)

Guest appearances
"Ghetto Love" by Stonebwoy (featuring Irene Logan)
"Mr Versatile" by Okyeame kwame (featuring Irene Logan)
"Power to Win" (with M.I, Flavour and Kwabena Kwabena)
"Runaway" by Asem (featuring Irene Logan)
"1000 Fights and Make Up" by Asem (featuring Irene Logan)
"Na Me Dey There" by Asem (featuring Irene Logan)
"Light and Darkness" by Trigmatic (featuring Irene Logan)
"Satisfy" by Eric Jeshrun (featuring Irene Logan)

Filmography 
Adams Apples (2012)
Fix Us (2019)

Awards and nominations

See also
List of Liberian musicians

References

1984 births
Living people
Liberian singers
Liberian songwriters
Musicians from Monrovia